Ben H. Allen (III.) is an American Grammy Award-winning record producer, mixer and songwriter, based in Atlanta, Georgia, United States. He has produced and mixed records by artists such as Walk the Moon, Animal Collective, Gnarls Barkley, Kaiser Chiefs, Cut Copy, Washed Out and Neon Indian.

Biography

Early years
Born in Athens, Georgia, Allen got his start recording his own and friends' bands on a four track cassette multitrack recorder in his parents' basement.  Eventually moving to New York City, Allen's work at Battery Studios and The Cutting Room Studios subsequently led to the position as an engineer with Sean Combs's Bad Boy Records, working on records by Mase, Carl Thomas, The Notorious B.I.G., Puff Daddy and others.

Return to Georgia
In 2001, he relocated to Atlanta, and began a long relationship with CeeLo Green, recording, producing and mixing records together, including 2006's St. Elsewhere by Gnarls Barkley also featuring Danger Mouse. The album reached No. 4 in the Billboard 200 as well as Platinum RIAA certification and won a Grammy Award for Best Urban Alternative Album.

His reputation for bringing the low-end aesthetics of Hip hop to Indie music led to numerous projects in that genre in the years to follow. In 2009, Allen recorded, mixed and co-produced Animal Collective's Merriweather Post Pavilion which received Album of The Year honors from publications including Spin and Entertainment Weekly. That same year Allen released Southern Gothic by The Constellations on his own record label MakeRecordsNotBombs, which was eventually re-released by Virgin Records in 2010.  He also co-wrote and co-produced the Asher Roth single "I Love College" during this period and co-wrote Here to Stay for the international No. 1 album Back to Basics.

In 2010, Allen produced and mixed Deerhunter's Halcyon Digest, as well as releasing two EPs on MakeRecordsNotBombs by Athens, Georgia band Reptar. He also mixed singles for M.I.A. on her album MAYA. In 2011, Allen mixed Zonoscope for Australian band Cut Copy, as well as Within and Without by Washed Out. The same year, he reunited with CeeLo Green co-producing and co-writing the No. 2 Billboard Hot 100 single "Bright Lights Bigger City", which appeared on The Lady Killer. In 2012, Allen produced Walk the Moon's self-titled album, including the No. 7 Billboard Hot 100 single "Anna Sun".

Personal life and advocacy 
Ben Allen currently resides in Atlanta, and works out of Maze Studios in the Reynoldstown neighborhood, which was featured prominently in the vinyl sleeve of Belle and Sebastian's Girls in Peacetime Want to Dance. He is known as an avid basketball fan and season ticket holder for the Atlanta Hawks, which created a public battle with notorious Boston Celtics fans Cut Copy over Twitter during the mixing of Zonoscope. He has also been an outspoken leader in the record industry, leading the opposition movement to a proposed ordinance by the city of Atlanta placing restrictions on recording studios to keep them from operating in proximity to residential areas. Allen was vocal about the adverse effects the proposed law would have on the music industry, speaking out at council meetings, in the media and lobbying council members. The ordinance was rejected by the Atlanta City Council on January 16, 2017. Allen has also appeared regularly as a guest lecturer in the University of Georgia music program.

Discography

References

Year of birth missing (living people)
Living people
Record producers from Georgia (U.S. state)
Musicians from Atlanta
Songwriters from Georgia (U.S. state)
21st-century American composers
Musicians from Athens, Georgia